This is a list of law enforcement agencies in the U.S. state of Idaho.

According to the US Bureau of Justice Statistics' 2008 Census of State and Local Law Enforcement Agencies, the state had 117 law enforcement agencies employing 3,146 sworn police officers, about 206 for each 100,000 residents.

State agencies 
 Idaho Department of Correction
 Idaho Department of Juvenile Corrections
 Idaho Fish and Game Commission
 Idaho Conservation Officers
 Idaho State Police
 Idaho State Fire Marshal
 Idaho Weigh Station Division
 Idaho State Brand Inspector

County agencies 

Ada County Sheriff's Office
Adams County Sheriff's Office  
Bannock County Sheriff's Office  
Bear Lake County Sheriff's Office  
Benewah County Sheriff's Office 
Bingham County Sheriff's Office
Blaine County Sheriff's Office 
Boise County Sheriff's Office
Bonner County Sheriff's Office
Bonneville County Sheriff's Office
Boundary County Sheriff's Office
Butte County Sheriff's Office
Camas County Sheriff's Office
Canyon County Sheriff's Office
Caribou County Sheriff's Office
Cassia County Sheriff's Office
Clark County Sheriff's Office

Clearwater County Sheriff's Office
Custer County Sheriff's Office
Elmore County Sheriff's Office
Franklin County Sheriff's Office
Fremont County Sheriff's Office
Gem County Sheriff's Office
Gooding County Sheriff's Office
Idaho County Sheriff's Office
Jefferson County Sheriff's Office
Jerome County Sheriff's Office
Kootenai County Sheriff's Office
Latah County Sheriff's Office
Lemhi County Sheriff's Office

Lewis County Sheriff's Office
Lincoln County Sheriff's Office
Madison County Sheriff's Office
Minidoka County Sheriff's Office
Nez Perce County Sheriff's Office
Oneida County Sheriff's Office
Owyhee County Sheriff's Office
Payette County Sheriff's Office
Power County Sheriff's Office
Shoshone County Sheriff's Office
Teton County Sheriff's Office
Twin Falls County Sheriff's Office
Valley County Sheriff's Office
Washington County Sheriff's Office

City agencies 

Aberdeen Police Department
Albion Police Department
American Falls Police Department  
Ashton Police Department    
Blackfoot Police Department  
Boise Police Department  
Bonners Ferry Police Department  
Buhl Police Department  
Caldwell Police Department  
Cascade Police Department    
Chubbuck Police Department 
Coeur d'Alene Police Department  
Coeur d'Alene Tribal Police Department  
Eagle Police Department
Emmett Police Department  
Filer Police Department    
Fort Hall Tribal Police Department    
Fruitland Police Department  
Garden City Police Department   
Gooding Police Department  
Grangeville Police Department   
Hailey Police Department
Heyburn Police Department
Homedale Police Department
Idaho City Police Department
Idaho Falls Police Department  
Inkom Police Department
Iona Police Department
Jerome Police Department  
Kamiah Marshal's Office  
Kellogg Police Department  
Ketchum Police Department  
Kimberly-Hansen Police Department
Kuna Police Department
Lewiston Police Department
McCall Police Department  
Meridian Police Department

Montpelier Police Department 
Moscow Police Department  
Mountain Home Police Department
Nampa Police Department  
Nez Perce Tribal Police Department  
Orofino Police Department
Osburn Police Department 
Parma Police Department
Payette Police Department  
Pinehurst Police Department
Plummer Police Department  
Pocatello Police Department  
Ponderay Police Department
Post Falls Police Department  
Preston Police Department
Priest River Police Department   
Rathdrum Police Department
Rexburg Police Department  
Rigby Police Department  
Rupert Police Department 
Salmon Police Department  
Sandpoint Police Department
Shelley Police Department 
Soda Springs Police Department  
Spirit Lake Police Department   
Star Police Department
Sun Valley Police Department  
Troy Police Department 
Twin Falls Police Department  
Ucon Police Department 
Weiser Police Department  
Wendell Police Department  
Wilder Police Department

Defunct agencies 

Alameda Village Police Department
Arco Police Department 
Athol Police Department
Avery Police Department   
Bellevue Marshal's Office  
Boise Airport Police Department
Burks Police Department
Challis Police Department  
Clark Fork Police Department    
Council Police Department
Deary Police Department
Declo Police Department  
Elk City Police Department
Fairfield Police Department 
Glenns Ferry Police Department 
Hagerman Police Department
Hansen Police Department
Hayden Police Department
Hazelton Police Department
Horseshoe Bend Police Department 
Idaho Falls Airport Police Department 

Juliaetta Police Department  
Ketchum Police Department
Lapwai Police Department
Lava Hot Springs Police Department 
Leadore Police Department
Malad City Police Department
Malta Police Department
Murtaugh Police Department
New Plymouth Police Department
Nezperce Police Department
Parker Police Department
Paul Police Department 
Roberts Police Department 
Smelterville Police Department
Stanley Police Department
Stites Police Department 
Tensed Police Department 
Wallace Police Department 
Wardner Police Department
Warren Police Department
Winchester Police Department

School agencies 

Boise State University Security
College of Western Idaho campus safety and security
Idaho State University department of public safety
North Idaho College campus security
University of Idaho security services

References

Idaho
Law enforcement agencies of Idaho
Law enforcement agencies